Adrià Moreno Sala (born 19 August 1991) is a Spanish former cyclist, who competed as a professional between 2016 and 2022.

Major results

2014
 1st Volta a Lleida
 3rd Overall Vuelta a León
2017
 10th Beaumont Trophy
2018
 1st Mountains classification, Circuit des Ardennes International
 2nd Overall Vuelta a Tenerife
1st Stages 2 & 3
 7th Overall Tour du Jura Cycliste
 10th Tour du Gévaudan Occitanie
2019
 1st Overall Vuelta a Tenerife
1st Stages 2a (TTT), 3 & 4
2020
 6th Overall Le Tour de Savoie Mont Blanc
2021
 6th Mercan'Tour Classic Alpes-Maritimes
 6th Overall Oberösterreichrundfahrt
 9th Overall Tour Alsace

References

External links

1991 births
Living people
Spanish male cyclists
Cyclists from Catalonia
People from Olot
Sportspeople from the Province of Girona
21st-century Spanish people